Grant Earl Feasel (June 28, 1960 – July 15, 2012) was an American football center in the National Football League (NFL) for the Baltimore/Indianapolis Colts, Minnesota Vikings, and Seattle Seahawks.

Early years
Born and raised in Barstow, California, Feasel graduated from Barstow High School in 1978, then was a standout football player and a first-team All-America center at Abilene Christian University in Abilene, Texas. In 1997, he was named to the NCAA Division II Team of the Quarter Century.

Professional career
Feasel was selected in the sixth round of the 1983 NFL Draft by the Baltimore Colts. He played in the 1983 season in Baltimore, then the franchise relocated to Indianapolis. He played part of the 1984 season, then was traded mid-season to the Minnesota Vikings.

He played two years for the Vikings, then was traded to the Seattle Seahawks in 1987, where he played six of his ten years in the NFL.

Personal life
Feasel married Cyndy and they had three children: sons Sean and Spencer, and daughter Sarah. His older brother Greg (b.1958) also played at Abilene Christian and in the NFL.

After football
Feasel died at age 52 in 2012 in Fort Worth, Texas. His family donated his brain to the Concussion Legacy Foundation. He was diagnosed posthumously with chronic traumatic encephalopathy (CTE), a degenerative brain disease.

See also

List of NFL players with chronic traumatic encephalopathy

References

External links
 
 Cyndy Feasel.com – Who was Grant Feasel?
 Seahawks Legends.com – Remembering Grant Feasel

1960 births
2012 deaths
People from Barstow, California
Sportspeople from San Bernardino County, California
Players of American football from California
American football centers
Abilene Christian Wildcats football players
Baltimore Colts players
Indianapolis Colts players
Minnesota Vikings players
Seattle Seahawks players